Ttangkkeut or Ddangkkeut, located at Songho-ri (송호리 松湖里), Songji-myeon (송지면 松旨面), Haenam County, South Jeolla Province, South Korea, is the southernmost area of the Korean peninsula. It is also called Tomal, all of which mean "the edge of the land" in Korean.

Ttangkkeut Village (Ttangkkeut maeul, 땅끝마을) lies in the area where Galdusan, a small mountain stands. 

Wando Islands, also favorite tourist zone, are located less than an hour's drive from Ttangkkeut village.

Local attractions
Mihwangsa
Daeheungsa

References

External links
 해남 땅끝마을 at the Hankuk Ilbo
  해남땅끝마을 at the Yahoo! Korea

Geography of South Jeolla Province
Tourist attractions in South Korea
Haenam County
Tourist attractions in South Jeolla Province